Denys Zavhorodniy (born August 5, 1979) is a retired freestyle swimmer from Ukraine, who was specialized in the long-distance events. He won the bronze medal in the men's 1500 m freestyle event at the 1997 European Championships in Seville, Spain, behind country man Igor Snitko (silver). He represented his native country at the 1996 Summer Olympics in Atlanta, Georgia.

References
 Sports-Reference profile

1979 births
Living people
Ukrainian male freestyle swimmers
Olympic swimmers of Ukraine
Swimmers at the 1996 Summer Olympics
European Aquatics Championships medalists in swimming
Universiade medalists in swimming
Universiade bronze medalists for Ukraine